JoAnn Watson (born April 19, 1951) is an American pastor, media personality and was a Detroit city councilor for ten years. She currently is an on-air personality for 910 AM Superstation/WFDF and Comcast Channel 91 WHPR as the host of Wake Up Detroit. Watson also appears as an on-air television personality for The Word Network as the host of Wake Up World.

Watson is an associate professor at Wayne County Community College, where she teaches English. Watson also serves as the Associate Pastor of West Side Unity Church and is a faculty member at the Unity Urban Ministerial School.

Personal life
JoAnn Watson was born and raised in Detroit, Michigan. She is the daughter of Jefferson Nichols Sr. and Rev. Lestine Kent Nichols.

Education
A 1968 graduate of Detroit Central High School, Watson received her Bachelor of Arts degree in Journalism from the University of Michigan, who has recognized her as a "Distinguished Alumnus". In 1996, the University of Michigan also awarded Watson the "Leonard F. Sain Esteemed Alumni Award". Watson also was awarded an honorary Doctorate in Humanities.

Community activism
Watson began her career in public service as the executive director of the Downtown Detroit YWCA. She would eventually rise to the position of assistant executive director of the National YWCA. From 1987 to 1990, she worked the New York headquarters, where her responsibilities included directing the Office of Racial Justice.

In 1989, Watson was selected as a delegate to the Women for Meaningful Summits/USA, which was held in the Union of Soviet Socialist Republics.

Watson would go on to serve as the executive director of the Detroit NAACP, the nation's largest NAACP branch. Watson is the only woman to ever serve in this role.

In 2001, Watson was selected to serve as a delegate to the UN World Conference Against Racism, which was held in Durban, South Africa.

In 2016, Watson was chosen by American Girl as one member of its six-member advisory board. The board's responsibility was to ensure the historical accuracy and cultural authenticity of Melody—a doll that depicts a 9-year old African American girl growing up in Detroit during the Civil Rights Movement of the 1960s.

Watson is the founding President of the National Association of Black Talk Show Hosts; is a consultant to Pathways to College; is a member of the Detroit Council of Elders; is a member of the National Black Council of Elders. and has served as President of the National Anti-Klan Network and as President of the Center for Democratic Renewal.

Published writings
Watson was a contributing author to "Should America Pay?", Dr. Raymond Winbush's 2003 publication on Reparations, and wrote the foreword in Herb Boyd's 2017 book, "Black Detroit: A People's History of Self Determination."

Political career
Prior to her service as a member of the city council, Watson served as public liaison for Congressman John Conyers.

In 2003, Watson filed to run in a Special Election called to fill a vacancy on the Detroit City Council, which was created when Councilwoman Brenda Scott died on September 2, 2002. That February, Dick Gregory headlined Watson's first political fundraiser. On April 29, 2003, Watson won the Special Election 52% to 48%, defeating the highly favored Gil Hill,  who was famous for playing the sharp-tongued police inspector in three Beverly Hills Cop movies.

Watson would subsequently win re-election to City Council and served as City Council President Pro Tem. During her tenure, Watson sponsored thousands of laws, including: laws that banned texting and talking while driving; a ban on smoking in public places; and the "Water Affordability Plan," which helped low-income citizens avoid water shut-offs. In 2009, The Nation Magazine recognized Watson as "the most valuable local elected official in the USA."

During Watson's tenure on City Council, her staff included future Michigan State Legislator Coleman Young II, who interned in her office.

In 2013, Watson announced her intention to retire. In December of that, a celebration of her career was held at the Charles H. Wright Museum of African American History, where Dick Gregory again was the headliner.

Electoral history

See also

References

Living people
1951 births
Detroit City Council members
University of Michigan alumni
Michigan Democrats
Politicians from Detroit
21st-century American politicians
21st-century American women politicians
American talk radio hosts
American television talk show hosts
Radio personalities from Detroit
African-American radio personalities
African-American television personalities
African-American television talk show hosts
African-American city council members in Michigan
African-American women in politics
Women city councillors in Michigan
American women radio presenters
21st-century African-American women
21st-century African-American politicians
20th-century African-American people
20th-century African-American women